

Current Bench

Complete list of justices

Notes

References 

Pennsylvania
Justices